is a 1983 Japanese animated science fantasy film and the fourth Doraemon feature film, released on March 12, 1983, in Japan. Directed by Tsutomu Shibayama, the film is based on the Western myth of Atlantis, the lost city.

Plot
The plot happens when the Bermuda Triangle is on the news. Meanwhile, Doraemon and friends go camping after helping Nobita to finish his homework. They use an adaptation light to survive underwater, and an underwater buggy to commute. This buggy has feelings and likes Shizuka. Doraemon takes out a big tent that provides all their needs, and that night they have a barbecue, with Gian and Suneo wanting to go the Atlantic but disallowed by Doraemon. That night, Gian and Suneo take Buggy and travel through the Atlantic Ocean, trying to find a treasure ship. But not realizing that the effects of the adaptation light can fade over time, they lose consciousness, and their friends, who have been looking for them, think they're dead, but they somehow wake up soon. They find the ship and Nobita, who is outside, sees a strange fish shaped craft that started attacking him with an energy weapon. He managed to evade it, but the others didn't believe his story. 

That night, Buggy wakes Shizuka and reveals he saw what happened with Gian and Suneo when they lost consciousness, showing his memory like a movie projector. The footage shows a strange underwater craft that's controlled by two human like figures. Soon, everyone else watches the footage as well, seeing these "Sea men" saving Gian and Suneo with their own Adaptation Light, before the craft Nobita saw appears and starts attacking them. Not long after, a giant squid appears and attacks the group, breaking their camp, but a strange light knocks the creature out. The group then sees the Sea men in front of them, but they too were knocked out by the stunning light.

Nobita, Doraemon, and Shizuka later wakes up in a room where they meet one of the sea man called Eru, revealed to be inhabitants of the underwater kingdom of Mu. The Prime Minister of Mu welcomes the group, but doesn't allow them to leave due to the kingdom not wanting humans to know about their existence. While Gian and Suneo are put in a cell, the group rescues them and flee the kingdom, with Eru realizing their escape and giving chase. Doraemon then uses his hat, which turns into be a subterranean room that can move, causing Eru to lose sight of them. However, the fish craft suddenly attacks Eru, shooting his ship. Gian rushes out with the group to save Eru, but it caused him to be arrested and given the death sentence for crossing the border.

While the group is put in a cell, Eru tries to defend them in a trial, which got interrupted by a ship crash landing. It is revealed that another undersea kingdom, Atlantis, now controlled by robots, was about to destroy the Earth with nuclear weapons after mistaking a volcano eruption for an invasion. After convincing the Prime minister, Eru sets the group free and went on a journey with them into Atlantis, which is in the Bermuda Triangle. After bypassing a fleet of fish craft and the barrier that leads into the kingdom with Doraemon's hat, they went on to search the "Devil's Castle", where Atlantis' main computer, Poseidon, is at. But having difficulty looking for it, Shizuka allows herself to be captured by Poseidon's iron guards, a bipedal fish robot, so the group can follow it as she's taken to the castle.

Using Doraemon's weapon gadgets, the group enters the castle, facing hordes of iron guards, and while Shizuka is brought upon Poseidon, they got separated. Doraemon fell from a high place, while Eru, Nobita, Gian, and Suneo got captured by the iron guards. Just as Poseidon about to sacrifice Shizuka, thinking it will stop the volcano, Doraemon stops it, but fell unconscious shortly. As Shizuka cries over the robot, Buggy suddenly appears from Doraemon's pocket, and goes straight into Poseidon, crashing and destroying both of them. With Poseidon destroyed, the iron guards stops working, allowing Shizuka and Doraemon to rescue the others and leave before the erupting volcano destroys the castle. After returning to Mu, Doraemon and his friends are hailed as heroes. The story ends after Shizuka looks at one of buggy's screws, and the group saying farewell to Eru.

Cast

Release
The film was released in Japan on March 12, 1983.

References

External links
JMDB entry  

Films directed by Tsutomu Shibayama
1983 films
1983 anime films
Nobita and the Castle of the Undersea Devil
Films scored by Shunsuke Kikuchi
Films set in Atlantis
1980s Japanese-language films
1980s children's animated films
Japanese children's fantasy films